Idoli controluce is a 1965 Italian film directed by Enzo Battaglia.

Cast
Omar Sivori as himself
Massimo Girotti as	Ugo Sanfelice
Valeria Ciangottini as Liliana
Joanna Shimkus as Alexandra
Riccardo Garrone as Arturo Baldi
Gaspare Zola as Nanni Moretti
Angela Freddi as Ada Mauri
Nicole Tessier as Olivia Cesarini Argan
John Charles as himself
Edy Biagetti as Sporting manager
Giuseppe Adami as himself
Beppe Barletti as Newspaperman
Alfredo Dari as Renato Cesarini

Music

All music by Ennio Morricone.

 "Le Cose Piu' Importanti" – 2:09 (Lyrics by Sergio Bardotti; Sung by Pierfilippi)
 "Sophisticated Boy" – 2:06
 "Le Meno Importanti" – 04:10
 "Relax In Solitudine" – 2:28
 "Rendez-Vous" – 2:32
 "Le Meno Importanti" – 2:23 (version with guitar)
 "Le Meno Importanti" – 2:03 (version with choir)

References

External links
 

1965 films
1960s Italian-language films
Films scored by Ennio Morricone
Italian association football films
1960s Italian films